Evijärvi is a municipality of Finland.

It is located in the Southern Ostrobothnia region.

Neighbouring municipalities are Kauhava, Kronoby, Lappajärvi, Pedersöre and Veteli.

The municipality is unilingually Finnish.

Notable people born in Evijärvi
Jalmari Linna (1891 – 1954)
Aleksi Kiviaho (1913 – 1986)
Ilmari Linna (1917 – 1981)
Tea Ista (1932 – 2014)
Esko Ahonen (1955 – )

References

External links

Municipality of Evijärvi – Official website 

 
Populated places established in 1867